Beneath the Blue, also known as Way of the Dolphin, is a 2010 American drama film sequel to the 2007 Michael Sellers' film Eye of the Dolphin starring Carly Schroeder. It is distributed by Monterey Media and Quantum Entertainment. The film was written by the same writer as the prequel, Wendell Morris. The film stars Paul Wesley, Caitlin Wachs, and David Keith. A then-unknown Samantha Jade makes her film debut. The film was released on October 24, 2010.

Plot
Dolphin researchers suspect the US Navy's sonar program is causing dolphin deaths. When the US Navy abducts a scientific research dolphin, a teenage dolphin researcher, Alyssa Hawk, risks getting caught to save the dolphin.

Cast
Paul Wesley  as Craig Morrison
Caitlin Wachs  as Alyssa Hawk
Ivana Miličević as Gwen
Michael Ironside  as Blaine
Christine Adams as Tamika
George Harris as Daniel
David Keith as Dr. Hawk
Samantha Jade as Kita
Leah Eneas as Duvey

References

External links

American independent films
2010 films
Films about dolphins
2010 drama films
British independent films
British drama films
2010 independent films
2010s English-language films
American drama films
2010s American films
2010s British films